Jesse Edwards  was an American baseball second baseman and pitcher in the Negro leagues. He played with the Memphis Red Sox in 1923 and 1924, the Birmingham Black Barons in 1925, and the Nashville Elite Giants in 1929 and 1930.

References

External links
 and Baseball-Reference Black Baseball stats and Seamheads

Nashville Elite Giants players
Birmingham Black Barons players
Memphis Red Sox players
Year of birth missing
Year of death missing
Baseball pitchers